Kopargaon is a town and municipality located in the Ahmednagar district of the Indian state of Maharashtra.

Geography
It has an average elevation of 593 meters (2,117 feet) and lies on the banks of the Godavari River.

Demographics
In the India census of 2011,   The town of Kopargaon had a population of 65,273.  The population is represented as 51% male, 49% female.  Thirteen percent of the population is under 6 years of age.
Kopargaon has a literacy rate of 69%.  Male literacy is 76%, female literacy is 62%.  This compares favorably with the India national literacy of 59.5%.

References

Talukas in Maharashtra
Cities and towns in Ahmednagar district